The Dialogues of Gregory the Great is a collection of four books of miracles, signs, wonders, and healings done by the holy men of sixth-century Italy.

Summary
Writing in Latin in a time of plague and war, Gregory structured his work as a conversation between himself and Peter, a deacon. His focus is on miraculous events in the lives of monastics.

The second book is devoted to a life of Saint Benedict.

Reception
The Dialogues were the most popular of Gregory's works during the Middle Ages, and in modern times have received more scholarly attention than the rest of his works combined. From this, the author himself is sometimes known as Gregory the Dialogist.

Pope Zachary translated the Dialogues into Greek.

References

External links

Text
 A critical edition of the entire Dialogues in Latin with a Greek translation, in Sancti Gregorii Papae I, cognomento Magni, opera omnia jam olim ad manuscriptos codices Romanos, Gallicanos, Anglicanos emendata, aucta, & illustrata notis, studio & labore Monachorum Ordinis Sancti Benedicti, e Congregatione Sancti Mauri, published by Carobolus and Pompeiatus in Venice in 1769.
 Partial text of the Dialogues,  including the preface and book 2, at the Bibliotheca Augustana

Translations
 
 
 

6th-century Christian texts
Works by Pope Gregory I
6th-century Latin books
590s